In telecommunication and data transmission, serial communication is the process of sending data one bit at a time, sequentially, over a communication channel or computer bus. This is in contrast to parallel communication, where several bits are sent as a whole, on a link with several parallel channels.

Serial communication is used for all long-haul communication and most computer networks, where the cost of cable and synchronization difficulties make parallel communication impractical. Serial computer buses are becoming more common even at shorter distances, as improved signal integrity and transmission speeds in newer serial technologies have begun to outweigh the parallel bus's advantage of simplicity (no need for serializer and deserializer, or SerDes) and to outstrip its disadvantages (clock skew, interconnect density). The migration from PCI to PCI Express is an example.

Cables

Many serial communication systems were originally designed to transfer data over relatively large distances through some sort of data cable.

Practically all long-distance communication transmits data one bit at a time, rather than in parallel, because it reduces the cost of the cable. The cables that carry this data (other than "the" serial cable) and the computer ports they plug into are usually referred to with a more specific name, to reduce confusion.

Keyboard and mouse cables and ports are almost invariably serial—such as PS/2 port, Apple Desktop Bus and USB.

The cables that carry digital video are almost invariably serial—such as coax cable plugged into a HD-SDI port, a webcam plugged into a USB port or FireWire port, Ethernet cable connecting an IP camera to a Power over Ethernet port, FPD-Link, etc.

Other such cables and ports, transmitting data one bit at a time, include Serial ATA, Serial SCSI, Ethernet cable plugged into Ethernet ports, the Display Data Channel using previously reserved pins of the VGA connector or the DVI port or the HDMI port.

Serial buses

Many communication systems were generally designed to connect two integrated circuits on the same printed circuit board, connected by signal traces on that board (rather than external cables).

Integrated circuits are more expensive when they have more pins.  To reduce the number of pins in a package, many ICs use a serial bus to transfer data when speed is not important.  Some examples of such low-cost serial buses include RS-232, SPI, I²C, UNI/O, 1-Wire and PCI Express.

Serial versus parallel
The communication links, across which computers (or parts of computers) talk to one another, may be either serial or parallel. A parallel link transmits several streams of data simultaneously along multiple channels (e.g., wires, printed circuit tracks, or optical fibers); whereas, a serial link transmits only a single stream of data.

Although a serial link may seem inferior to a parallel one, since it can transmit less data per clock cycle, it is often the case that serial links can be clocked considerably faster than parallel links in order to achieve a higher data rate. Several factors allow serial to be clocked at a higher rate:
Clock skew between different channels is not an issue (for unclocked asynchronous serial communication links).
A serial connection requires fewer interconnecting cables (e.g., wires/fibers) and hence occupies less space. The extra space allows for better isolation of the channel from its surroundings.
Crosstalk is less of an issue, because there are fewer conductors in proximity.
Budgets for power use, power dissipation, cable cost, component cost, IC die area, PC board area, ESD protection, etc. can be focused on a single link.

In many cases, serial is cheaper to implement than parallel. Many ICs have serial interfaces, as opposed to parallel ones, so that they have fewer pins and are therefore less expensive.

Examples of architectures

ARINC 818 Avionics Digital Video Bus
Atari SIO (Joe Decuir credits his work on Atari SIO as the basis of USB)
Binary Synchronous Communications BSC - Binary Synchronous Communications
CAN Control Area Network Vehicle Bus
ccTalk Used in the money transaction and point-of-sale industry
CoaXPress industrial camera protocol over Coax
DMX512 control of theatrical lighting
Ethernet
Fibre Channel (high-speed, for connecting computers to mass storage devices)
FireWire
HDMI
HyperTransport
InfiniBand (very high speed, broadly comparable in scope to PCI)
I²C multidrop serial bus
MIDI control of electronic musical instruments
MIL-STD-1553A/B
Morse code telegraphy
PCI Express
Profibus
RS-232 (low-speed, implemented by serial ports)
RS-422 multidrop serial bus
RS-423
RS-485 multidrop multimaster serial bus
SDI-12 industrial sensor protocol
SERCOM
Serial ATA
Serial Attached SCSI
Shift Register with serial-in and serial-out configuration
SONET and SDH (high speed telecommunication over optical fibers)
SpaceWire Spacecraft communication network
SPI
T-1, E-1 and variants (high speed telecommunication over copper pairs)
Universal Serial Bus (for connecting peripherals to computers)
UNI/O multidrop serial bus
1-Wire multidrop serial bus

See also

 8N1
 Asynchronous serial communication
 Comparison of synchronous and asynchronous signalling
 Computer bus
 Data transmission
 Federal Standard 1037C
 High-Level Data Link Control (HDLC)
 List of device bandwidths
 MIL-STD-188
 Serial Peripheral Interface Bus
 Serial port
 Synchronous serial communication
 Universal asynchronous receiver/transmitter (UART)

References

External links
Serial Interface Tutorial for Robotics (contains many practical examples)
Serial interfaces listing (with pinouts)
Wiki: Serial Ports
Visual studio 2008 coding for Serial communication
Introduction to I²C and SPI protocols
Serial communication introduction
Serial Port Programming in Linux

 
Physical layer protocols